State Route 136 (SR 136) is a state highway in the U.S. state of California, running along the northern edge of Owens Lake in Inyo County from U.S. Route 395 in Lone Pine to State Route 190.

Route description
The western terminus of SR 136 is at U.S. Route 395 in Lone Pine, near the Lone Pine Airport. SR 136 heads southeast, crossing through the small towns of Swansea and Keeler as it passes along the north shore of the dry lake Owens Lake. The eastern terminus is at State Route 190 which continues on to Death Valley. 

SR 136 is part of the California Freeway and Expressway System, but is not part of the National Highway System, a network of highways that are considered essential to the country's economy, defense, and mobility by the Federal Highway Administration.

History

SR 136 was adopted as a state route in 1933 as part of Legislative Route 127. It was defined to run from US 99 at Tipton, to US 66 (formerly LRN 31, currently I-15) at Baker. The route would run through Porterville, the Sierra Nevada (only partially constructed), Olancha, and Death Valley. The main line of the route would cross the southeast shore of the Owens Lake. An unsigned branch, also apart of LRN 127 would run along the northeast shore, connecting at US 395 just south of Lone Pine. 

In 1964, all of the state routes were renumbered. LRN 127 was divided into three separate state routes. Route 190 became SR 190 over its signed portion. Similarly, Route 127 became SR 127 over its signed portion. The short branch section became a signed route (although poorly signed) as SR 136. The route has not changed since the 1964 renumbering.

Major intersections

See also

References

External links

Caltrans: Route 136 highway conditions
California Highways: Route 136
California @ AARoads.com - State Route 136

Roads in Inyo County, California
136